Kalmalap Michel Coulon (born 3 December 1995) is a Vanuatuan footballer who plays as a midfielder for Tupuji Imere F.C. and the Vanuatu national football team.

International career

International goals
Scores and results list Vanuatu's goal tally first.

Personal life
Michel has a twin brother, Raoul, who also plays for Tupuji Imere as well as the national team. They played together at the 2010 Summer Youth Olympics.

References

External links
Michel Coulon at Oceania Football Center

1995 births
Living people
Vanuatuan footballers
Vanuatu international footballers
Vanuatu under-20 international footballers
Vanuatu youth international footballers
Association football midfielders
Footballers at the 2010 Summer Youth Olympics
Twin sportspeople
Vanuatuan twins
People from Port Vila